Naryn (Narin) is a rural locality (an ulus) in Zaigrayevsky District, Republic of Buryatia, Russia. The population was 219 as of 2010. There are 3 streets.

Geography 
Naryn is located 102 km northeast of Zaigrayevo (the district's administrative centre) by road. Tarbagatay is the nearest rural locality.

References 

Rural localities in Zaigrayevsky District